Banana Wind is the twentieth studio album by American popular music singer-songwriter Jimmy Buffett. It was released on MCA and Margaritaville Records on June 4, 1996, debuting at number four on the Billboard 200.

Songs
"Jamaica Mistaica" is about an incident in Jamaica on January 16, 1996, in which local authorities mistook Buffett's seaplane, the Hemisphere Dancer, for a smuggling operation.  The plane was shot; shortly before, Buffett, U2's Bono, and Island Records producer Chris Blackwell had been aboard.  No one was injured, though there were several bullet holes in the plane. (The plane itself is now on display at Universal CityWalk, across from Buffett's Margaritaville restaurant.)  "Desdemona's Building a Rocketship" concerns the character Desdemona from Buffett's 1992 novel Where Is Joe Merchant?  The song "False Echoes" (Havana 1921) references the ship captained by Jimmy's grandfather, the five-masted barkentine Chickamauga, named after the civil war vessel CSS Chickamauga.

Track listing
All songs by Jimmy Buffett, Russ Kunkel, Roger Guth, Peter Mayer and Jim Mayer, except where noted.
"Only Time Will Tell" – 4:12
"Jamaica Mistaica" – 5:54
"School Boy Heart" (Jimmy Buffett, Matt Betton) – 4:35
"Banana Wind" (Instrumental) – 3:57
"Holiday" (Jimmy Buffett, Ralph MacDonald, Bill Eaton, William Salter) – 5:05
"Bob Robert's Society Band" (Jimmy Buffett, Amy Lee) – 3:44
"Overkill" – 4:55
"Desdemona's Building a Rocket Ship" – 7:10
"Mental Floss" – 4:02
"Cultural Infidel" – 3:58
"Happily Ever After (Now And Then)" (Jimmy Buffett, Dave Loggins) – 4:18
"False Echoes (Havana 1921)" (Jimmy Buffett) – 15:54
"Treetop Flyer" (Hidden Track) (Stephen Stills) – Start around 20 seconds after False Echoes ends

Personnel

The Coral Reefer Band
Jimmy Buffett – guitar and vocals
Michael Utley – keyboards,
Greg "Fingers" Taylor – harmonica
Robert Greenidge – steel drums, percussion
Ralph MacDonald – percussion
Mac McAnally – acoustic guitar, mandolin, vocals
Roger Guth – drums
Peter Mayer – guitars, vocals
Jim Mayer – bass, vocals
Amy Lee – saxophone
John Lovell – trumpet
Thom Mitchell – saxophone
Claudia Cummings – background vocals
Tina Gullickson – background vocals
Nadirah Shakoor – background vocals

Guest musicians
James Taylor – vocals
Ben Taylor – vocals
Bobby O'Dononvan – violin, penny whistle
Teddy Mulet – trombone
Freddy Fishstick (aka Jimmy Buffett) – piano, trombone, mandolin, and vibes

Charts

Weekly charts

Year-end charts

References

Jimmy Buffett albums
1996 albums
MCA Records albums